Zamor (christened Louis-Benoit) (1762 - February 7, 1820) was a French revolutionary of possibly Siddi Habshi origin from Bengal, who, as a boy of 11, was taken from Chittagong, Bengal Subah, Mughal Empire (now Bangladesh) by slave traders. Later, he was gifted to Countess du Barry and became her servant until informing on her to the Committee of Public Safety. He participated in the French Revolution and was imprisoned by the Girondins.

Early life and upbringing 
Zamor was born in 1762 at the town of Chittagong in the Principality of Bengal (now Bangladesh). In 1773, when he was eleven years old, he was captured by British slave traders, who trafficked him into France via Madagascar and sold him to Louis XV of France. The king gave the young boy to his mistress Countess du Barry, and he was christened Louis-Benoit. The countess developed a liking for the boy and educated him. Zamor developed a taste for literature and was inspired by the works of Rousseau. Until her death, the countess was under the incorrect impression that Zamor was African (although Zamor may have belonged to the Siddi ethnic group, which descend from the Bantu peoples of East Africa).

Records of the period suggest that Zamor was extremely mischievous as a child. She noted in her memoirs:

Role in the French Revolution 
When the French Revolution broke out, Zamor took the side of the revolutionaries and joined the Jacobins. He detested Countess du Barry and deplored her lavish lifestyle and cruel enslavement. He protested her repeated visits to England with the intention of retrieving her lost jewelry and warned her against protecting aristocrats. As an informant to the Committee of Public Safety, Zamor got the police to arrest the Countess in 1792 on her return from one of her many visits to England. The Countess, however, secured her release from jail and discovered the arrest was the handiwork of her slave, Zamor. She promptly dismissed Zamor from her household. In his freedom, Zamor was more vocal in his support for the revolution. He brought further charges against the Countess, which eventually led to her arrest, trial and execution by guillotine. At the trial, Zamor stated Chittagong was his birthplace.

Imprisonment 
Soon after the execution of the countess, Zamor was arrested by the Girondins on suspicion of being an accomplice of the countess and a Jacobin. He was tried and imprisoned, but was able to secure his release. He then fled from France, reappearing only in 1815 after the fall of Napoleon. Zamor bought a house in Rue Maître-Albert, near the Latin Quarter of Paris, and spent a few years as a schoolteacher.

Death 
Zamor died in poverty on 7 February 1820 and was buried in Paris.

In popular culture
Zamor aged 12 appears in Alexandre Dumas's novel Joseph Balsamo.

A two-page comic strip, La rue perdue (The Lost Street), was published in 1978. This strip features Gil Jourdan, a detective created by Maurice Tillieux. Set in 1953, Detective Jourdan tries to find out why a fake guillotine blade is hanging outside the door of a friend. The person responsible turns out to be a racist man obsessed with Madame du Barry, seeking to avenge her death through the life of Jourdan's friend who looks like Zamor. The story is set in rue Maître Albert, where Zamor resided before his death.

In Sofia Coppola's 2006 film Marie Antoinette, Madame du Barry (portrayed by Asia Argento) was shown in the company of an enslaved Black boy, who most likely was Zamor.

See also
 Jean Amilcar

References

References

1762 births
1820 deaths
People from Chittagong
French slaves
People of the French Revolution
Jacobins
Converts to Christianity from Islam
Habshis of Bengal